William Rupert Rees-Davies QC (19 November 1916 – 12 January 1992) was a British Conservative politician and barrister.

Early life
Rees-Davies was the son of Sir William Rees-Davies, Chief Justice of Hong Kong. He was born in Hong Kong while his father was serving as Chief Justice. His grandfather was William Davies, Liberal MP for Pembrokeshire

He was educated at Eton College and Trinity College, Cambridge, where he gained a cricket blue. He also played for the Kent Second XI. He was a right-arm fast-medium bowler.

Non-political career
He was a barrister, called to the bar by Inner Temple in 1939.   He was appointed a Queen's Counsel in 1973. He was commissioned in the Welsh Guards in 1939 and served until 1943 when he lost his right arm on service during World War II. Because he had lost his arm, he was some time referred to as the "one armed bandit".

Political career

Rees-Davies contested Nottingham South in 1950 and 1951. He was Member of Parliament for the Isle of Thanet from a 1953 by-election to 1974, then for Thanet West from 1974 to 1983 when his seat was abolished in boundary changes. He lost the selection for North Thanet to Roger Gale, and his attempts to reverse his deselection failed. He died in 1992, aged 75.

References

Times Guide to the House of Commons 1979

External links 
 
 Cricket career
 Photos of Rees-Davies from the SEAS archives

 

1916 births
1992 deaths
Conservative Party (UK) MPs for English constituencies
Welsh Guards officers
British Army personnel of World War II
People educated at Eton College
Alumni of Trinity College, Cambridge
Members of the Inner Temple
British amputees
UK MPs 1951–1955
UK MPs 1955–1959
UK MPs 1959–1964
UK MPs 1964–1966
UK MPs 1966–1970
UK MPs 1970–1974
UK MPs 1974
UK MPs 1974–1979
UK MPs 1979–1983
Cambridge University cricketers
British politicians with disabilities
Welsh cricketers
English barristers